Queimadas, Paraíba is a municipality in the state of Paraíba in the Northeast Region of Brazil. The town has the seventeenth GDP and is the twelfth largest city of the state.

See also
List of municipalities in Paraíba

References

Municipalities in Paraíba